Ashinsky (Äşä) is a rural locality (a village) in Krasnovoskhodsky Selsoviet, Iglinsky District, Bashkortostan, Russia. The population was 121 as of 2010. There are 3 streets.

Geography 
Ashinsky is located 27 km east of Iglino (the district's administrative centre) by road.

References 

Rural localities in Iglinsky District